Luis Raul Marrero (born January 23, 1974), also known by his stage name Funky, is a Puerto Rican rapper and songwriter. With seven solo albums and multiple jobs as a producer, Marrero is internationally recognized as a hip hop and reggaeton Christian artist. He has collaborated with Christian music musicians, including Marcos Witt, Jesus Adrian Romero, and KJ-52. Marrero has been nominated for two Latin Grammy awards.

Funky has collaborated and produced for singers Vico C, Triple Seven, 7th Poet, Manny Montes, KJ-52, Contagious, Marcos Witt, Israel & New Breed, Travy Joe, Julissa, Ezequiel Colon, Rey Pirin & DJ Blass, Kike Pavón, Redimi2, Evan Craft, Musiko and Alex Zurdo.

Background 
Marrero was born in San Juan, Puerto Rico, on January 23, 1974. He began to explore music at the age of 15 under the influence of Puerto Rican Vico C, with whom he would later work on two of his nine albums. He became a husband and father at age 16.

In 1997, he met Vico C, with whom he established a friendship and a business. They collaborated on an album, marking an important stride in Marrero's musical career. In 1998, after several marital crises with his wife and family, Marrero became a Christian. Marrero founded his own label, Funkytown Music, in 1999, the same year he produced Triple Seven's "Diferente".

In 2001, he collaborated as a producer on Manny Montes's album "Realidades", and Marrero also sang in one of the songs. That same year he had his first success as a singer and producer in the Christian music genre: "Funkytown". Media outlets in Puerto Rico, as well as the international media, liked it, and it became a favorite among young listeners. With less than a year in the Christian music world, Marrero received a nomination to the Grammy Latino in 2003.

After releasing the 2002 album Especie En Peligro, Marrero consolidated the position as a musical influence of the Christian youth. With this album, he acquired several nominations and awards: Premios ARPA (México, 2003 and 2004), Premios LA Conquista (California, 2004), Premio Integridad.com (2004) and Premios La Gente, (California, 2004), among others.

In 2004, Marrero launched the production Los Vencedores, an album with more than 15 artists and other notable people within the genres. In 2005, Marrero starred in his first live production: En vivo desde Costa Rica, which cemented his influence in the worldwide Christian reggaeton music genre that year. He then launched the production Vida Nueva, which involved some of the most well-known artists of the genre: Manny Montes, Triple Seven, Alex Zurdo, Quest, Dr. P., Sammy, among others.

In 2006, he made his first trip to South America, touring for 17 days and performing more than 25 concerts in Mexico, Argentina, Uruguay, Colombia, Dominican Republic, Panama and United States, and other countries.

Between 2006 and 2007, Marrero launched the production Corriendo Para Ganar, his third solo album and his sixth overall. Marrero resides in Orlando, Florida, with his wife and children, Luis Jr. (19), Jorge (18), and Karla (16). From there, he runs Funkytown Music Inc., producing his own albums and those of various Christian singers of the reggaeton genre.

In 2008, a year described as "a year of great challenges and dreams", he began his "Total Access Tour", during which he visited countries in Latin America and United States cities. Marrero announced the project "Flow Sinfónico", which displays a live soundtrack, accompanied by strings and horn arrangements.

In 2009, he made the tour "Conectado (Plugged-in) World Tour," which was based on the importance of the connection with God. The tour began May 8 in Viceroy Del Pino, Buenos Aires. Marrero also collaborated with American Christian rapper KJ-52 on the song "Fuego" from KJ-52's album Five-Two Television, and a music video has been filmed in Atlanta.

In February 2010, Marrero released the song "Hoy", which was the first single from his 2011 album Reset. In April 2010, he released the song "Corazones Puros", which was the second single from Reset. In January 2011, he released Reset. Later in 2011, the album earned Marrero a Latin Grammy award nomination. In May 2013, Marrero, with Redimi2, released the album Mas.

In 2020, he participated in the 116 album titled Sin Vergüenza, in collaboration with Lecrae in the single "La Fiesta". In 2021, he released an album called UNO with Alex Zurdo and Redimi2, reaching #1 on iTunes. Then, collaborated with Gerardo in the song "Agua amarga".

Funkytown Music

Funkytown Music is an American record label that produces Christian hip-hop and reggaeton music. Marrero founded the label in 1999. In that year the label released Diferente with Triple Seven, with Marrero as producer.

Discography

Albums 
 Funkytown (2002) 
 Especie En Peligro (2003)
 Los Vencedores (2004)
Vida Nueva [with DJ Pablo] (2005)
 Corriendo Para Ganar (2006)
Los Vencedores Platinum Edition (2008)
 Acceso Total Tour Edition (2008)
 Reset (2011)
 Indestructible (2015)
 Agua (2019)
 UNO [with Alex Zurdo and Redimi2] (2021)
 ROJO (2022)

Singles

References

External links 
 
 Triple Seven Official Website

1974 births
Living people
Puerto Rican rappers
21st-century American rappers